ADVISE (Analysis, Dissemination, Visualization, Insight, and Semantic Enhancement) is a research and development program within the United States Department of Homeland Security (DHS) Threat and Vulnerability Testing and Assessment (TVTA) portfolio. It is reportedly developing a massive data mining system, which would collect and analyze data on everyone in the United States and perform a "threat analysis" on them. The data can be anything from financial records, phone records, emails, blog entries, website searches, to any other electronic information that can be put into a computer system. This information is then analyzed, and used to monitor social threats such as community-forming, terrorism, political organizing, or crime.

ADVISE will possess the ability to store one quadrillion data entities.

The exact scope and degree of completion of the program is unclear. ADVISE is in the 2004-2006 Federal DHS Budget as a component of the $47 million TVTA program.

The program was officially scrapped in September 2007 after the agency's internal Inspector General found that pilot testing of the system had been performed using data on real people without required privacy safeguards in place.

See also 
 Data warehouse
 Defense Advanced Research Projects Agency (DARPA)
 ECHELON
 Information Awareness Office
 NSA warrantless surveillance controversy
 TALON (Threat and Local Observation Notice)

References

External links 
 US plans massive data sweep, February 9, 2006 article by Mark Clayton in the Christian Science Monitor
 Data Sciences Technology for Homeland Security Information Management and Knowledge Discovery, report of the Department of Homeland Security Workshop on Data Sciences conducted September 22–23, 2004, released in January 2005 by Sandia National Laboratories and Lawrence Livermore National Laboratory. See pages 7–8.
 Information to Insight in a Counterterrorism Context, report on ADVISE prepared for the US Department of Energy by Robert Burleson of the Lawrence Livermore National Laboratory at the University of California
 Threat & Vulnerability, Testing & Assessment - $47M, page 23 of Fiscal Year 2006 Budget Brief for the Department of Homeland Security Science & Technology Directory, by Parney Albright, March 1, 2005
  ADVISE at SourceWatch

United States Department of Homeland Security
Privacy of telecommunications
Mass surveillance